The FIS Alpine World Ski Championships 1939 in alpine skiing were the ninth edition of the competition, organized by the International Ski Federation (FIS), and were held 12–15 February in Kasprowy Wierch in the Western Tatras, south of Zakopane, Poland. Due to World War II, there would be a nine year hiatus of the official competition until the 1948 Winter Olympics.

Josef Jennewein, Wilhelm Walch and Helga Gödl were Austrians but after the Anschluss in 1938 they were citizen of Nazi-Germany. Their medals cache continue to be counted for Germany. Hellmuth Lantschner also was an Austrian but he had changed to Germany in 1935 and competed under the German Ski Federation after that time.

Medal summary

Men's events

Women's events

Medal table

References

1939 in alpine skiing
1939 in Polish sport
1939
International sports competitions hosted by Poland
Alpine skiing competitions in Poland
February 1939 sports events
Sports competitions in Zakopane